Frederick Hamilton Tarr (October 8, 1868 – May 13, 1944) was an American attorney and politician who was a member of the Massachusetts House of Representatives from 1904 to 1905, a member of the Massachusetts Governor's Council from 1916 to 1918, and the United States Attorney for the District of Massachusetts from 1926 to 1933.

His son, Frederick H. Tarr, Jr. was a Massachusetts state representative.

References

1868 births
Amherst College alumni
Harvard Law School alumni
People from Rockport, Massachusetts
Members of the Massachusetts Governor's Council
United States Attorneys for the District of Massachusetts
Republican Party members of the Massachusetts House of Representatives
1944 deaths